Leydon is a surname. Notable people with the surname include:

 Joe Leydon (born 1952), American film critic and historian
 John Leydon (1895–1979), Irish civil servant
 Mona Leydon (1915–2002), New Zealand swimmer
 Seamus Leydon (born 1942), Gaelic footballer
 Felicity Leydon-Davis (born 1994), New Zealand cricketer
 Oliver Leydon-Davis (born 1990), New Zealand badminton player
 Susannah Leydon-Davis (born 1992), New Zealand badminton player